Aloe fimbrialis  is a succulent plant species from Zambia and possibly Tanzania. A very unusual Aloe as it forms a caudex which can grow to five centimeters in diameter, the leaves grow up to ten centimeters long. The inflorescence can reach 90 centimeters in length and has coral-pink flowers. It usually grows on termite mounds. Aloe fimbrialis is a very rare aloe, first discovered in 1964  and formally described by Susan Carter Holmes in 1996 from a herbarium specimens. Graham Williamson rediscovered the species in 2002  on the border of Zambia and Angola, close to the source of the Zambezi River.

References

External links 
 Aloe fimbrialis  The Plant List
 Aloe fimbrialis  Encyclopedia of Life

  

fimbrialis
Plants described in 1996
Flora of Zambia